Lido Fanale Anteriore Lighthouse is an active lighthouse located on the northern tip of the island of Lido di Venezia, in the Venetian Lagoon on the Adriatic Sea; the place where is the main access to Venice by ship route.

Description
The tower is settled on a platform supported by wooden piles; the covering is painted with black and white horizontal bands.

The lighthouse, completely automated and powered by a solar unit, is managed by the Marina Militare with the identification code number 4177 E.F.

The lighthouse, completely automated and powered by a solar unit, is managed by the Marina Militare with the identification code number 4186 E.F.

See also
 List of lighthouses in Italy

References

External links

 Servizio Fari Marina Militare

Lighthouses in Italy
Buildings and structures in Veneto